Cyril Ellis may refer to:

 Darkie Ellis (Cyril Ellis, 1918–1950), British boxer
 Cyril Ellis (athlete) (1904–1973), British athlete